Isabelle Le Callennec (born 14 October 1966) is a French politician who represented Ille-et-Vilaine's 5th constituency in the National Assembly from 2012 to 2017.

References 

1966 births
Living people
Politicians from Nantes
Deputies of the 14th National Assembly of the French Fifth Republic
21st-century French women politicians
Women members of the National Assembly (France)
The Republicans (France) politicians
Union for a Popular Movement politicians
Mayors of places in Brittany